Tartaul de Salcie is a commune in Cahul District, Moldova. It is composed of two villages, Tartaul de Salcie and Tudorești. The population in 2002 was 250.

References

External links
 Official website

Communes of Cahul District